Pinwheel escapement, pin wheel escapement, or pin-wheel escapement might refer to:
Pinwheel escapement
Pin-pallet escapement